The purple-naped sunbird (Kurochkinegramma hypogrammicum) is a species of bird in the family Nectariniidae. It is the only species in the genus Kurochkinegramma. It is found in Southeast Asia from Myanmar to Sumatra and Borneo. Its natural habitat is subtropical or tropical moist lowland forests.

A study published in 2011 appeared to show that the purple-naped sunbird was phylogenetically nested within the genus Arachnothera. A subsequent 2017 study, conducted by some of the same authors and using additional sequence data, found that the purple-naped sunbird occupied a basal position to Arachnothera.  It was formerly placed in the genus Hypogramma until it was realised that the name was preoccupied within Lepidoptera.

References

External links
Image at ADW

purple-naped sunbird
Birds of Southeast Asia
purple-naped sunbird
Taxonomy articles created by Polbot
Taxobox binomials not recognized by IUCN